Blumaer Hill is a summit in Thurston County, Washington, in the United States.

A variant name is "Blumauer Hill". The hill has the name of Isaac and Solomon Blumauer, sibling businessmen in the local lumber industry.

References

Mountains of Thurston County, Washington